Douglas Jack Agu (born 19 August 1989), better known by his stage name Runtown, is a Nigerian singer, songwriter and producer.

Biography

Runtown was born on 19 August 1989 in Enugu but grew up partly in Abuja and Lagos, where he finished his primary education. After the death of his father, he moved to Abuja with his mother, who was working in the Ministry of Health.

In 2014 he released "Gallardo", a song which features vocals from Davido and was released as the first single off his debut studio album Ghetto University. Gallardo went on to win "Best Collaboration of the Year" at the 2014 edition of the Nigeria Entertainment Awards. On 23 November 2015, Runtown released his debut studio album titled Ghetto University via MTN Music Plus through Eric Many Entertainment. The album generated over ₦35million on the music portal thus earning him a spot in the list of "Top 5 Most Streamed Artist".

On 4 November 2016, Runtown released the ballad "Mad Over You", which charted at number 38 on the Billboard Twitter Top Tracks chart. Joey Akan from Pulse Nigeria described the song as a "self-produced track that draws inspiration from the Ghanaian Alkayida sound". Runtown told The Fader magazine that the song was inspired by African beauty.

On December 16, 2022, Runtown released the 'Signs' album, which Deborah Jayeoba from African Folder described as a "sign for Runtown to have a grip on his career because this recent taste of him doesn’t please the music palate".

Controversies

Ownership of "Aye"
In 2014, there were reports in the media that Runtown wrote "Aye". In an interview with the Nigerian Tribune, Runtown said, "A lot of people have been asking me that question. Davido has had a number of interviews where he addressed how the song came about. So if you want to learn more about Aye ask David or read his interviews".

Release of Kini Issue
In September 2020, He released his 2nd song since the pandemic called "Kini Issue". The song is from his forthcoming album Soundgod Fest Reloaded.

Exit from Eric Manny Entertainment
Runtown's contract with Eric Manny Entertainment expired in June 2018. He subsequently started his own label, Soundgod Music Group.

Discography

Ghetto University (2015)
Tradition (2020)
Signs (2022)

Awards and nominations

See also

 List of Nigerian musicians

References

Living people
1989 births
End SARS activists
Musicians from Enugu
Nigerian male singer-songwriters
21st-century Nigerian male singers
Nigerian hip hop musicians
Igbo singers
Rappers from Enugu